Aziz Mohammad Bhai is a Bangladeshi businessman, industrialist  and film producer. He has owned multiple successful businesses and is a pioneer in the Bangladesh steel industry. He has produced more than 50 films.

Background
Aziz Mohammad Bhai was born in 1962 to Mohammad Bhai and Khatija Mohammad Bhai, émigrés to Bangladesh from Gujarat, India and is of Gujarati and Persian descent. He owned a steel producing company for more than three decades and has been an innovator in a local pharmaceutical manufacturing industry with Ambee Pharmaceuticals. He was involved with several films produced under his production company, Ambee Films. Bhai is also a life member of the SAARC Chamber of Commerce.

Family

A father of four; two sons, and two daughters, Aziz has been living in Thailand for a long time.

In his absence, his wife Naureen Aziz Mohammad Bhai has been successfully running a number of family businesses in Bangladesh, including the ones in pharmaceuticals, the iron and steel sector, and consumer goods.

According to “Women on Boards of Companies Listed on the Dhaka Stock Exchange,” Naureen is the executive director and managing director of Ambee Pharmaceuticals, and chairman of the company's Management Committee.

The list, jointly published by the International Finance Corporation, Dhaka Stock Exchange, and the UN Women in March this year, also named her as the director of Bengal Steel Works Ltd, Ambee Ltd, AKES-B, and The Morning Sun.

She has also been named proprietor of Progoti Printing and Packaging.

Aziz Mohammad's brother, Raja Mohammad Bhai, died in 2010. Raja's wife Safinaz, died in 2020 of cancer. His parents, Khatija Mohammad Bhai and Mohammad Bhai, died in 2016 and 2018 respectively. His nephew, Amin Hudda, son of his elder sister Nurjehan Hudda, died in 2020 in prison. His cousin (daughter of his uncle Mubarak Ali), fashion designer Shamsha Hashwani, is married to the Hashwani family of Pakistan. His nephew, Tanveer Ali (son of his other cousin Nasreen), is the executive director of their family business, Olympic Industries.

His wife, Naureen's uncle is Bunty Islam, Aziz's ex-partner and co-accused in the murder case of Sohel Chowdhury. Naureen's aunt is Lubna Chowdhury, founder and principal of Bangladesh International Tutorial.

Business
Aziz Mohammad Bhai is one of the directors of Olympic Industries Limited and his father was the chairman of the company.

Controversy
On October 26, the Department of Narcotics Control seized liquor bottles and poker table with chips in an anti-narcotics operation at the house of businessman Aziz Mohammad Bhai. Although he was not in the country at that time. Many consider the industrialist a godfather because of the 'Bhai' in his name, however, Bhai is only a family title

References

External links
 

Bangladeshi businesspeople
People from Gujarat
Living people
1962 births